Butwal Multiple Campus (Nepali: बुटवल बहुमुखी क्याम्पस) is one of the constituent campus in Golpark, Butwal Municipality in western Nepal. It offers different Bachelor's and Master's program with affiliation from Tribhuvan University. The name Multiple is because it runs several courses in the disciplines of Arts, Science, Commerce and Law etc. There are varying schedule for classes, starting from 6:00 am.

The establishment of Butwal Multiple Campus has helped a lot in the development of this one time small village into a modern town in Nepal, and a hub of education. Students from nearby places like Palpa, Arghakhanchi, Syangja, Gulmi keep coming here to pursue their academics. Numerous faculty members of this institution have helped found many centres of academic excellence and Higher Secondary Schools which has definitely provided a fillip to Education sector in and around Butwal.

History 
Butwal  Multiple Campus was established in 2030 B.S. This campus has been running four bachelors’ level programs in the faculties of Humanities, Science, Education, Management and M.Ed. (Nepali, EPM), MA (English, Nepali, Economics), MBS  to provide education to the educationally disadvantaged students, women, backward ethnic groups and others. It began Master Level education, all the masters level program in 2057 B.S.

Programs

Bachelor 

 Bachelor of Business administration (B.B.A.)
 Bachelor of Business Studies (B.B.S)
 Bachelor of Science in (Physics, Chemistry, Micro-Biology)
 Bachelor of Science in Computer Science and Information Technology (BSc.CSIT)
 Bachelor of Education (B.Ed.)
 Bachelor of Education in Information and Communication Technology Education (BICTE/B.Ed. ICT)
 Bachelor of Arts (B.A.)
 Bachelor of Laws

Master 

 Master of Business Studies (MBS)
 Master of Arts (MA)
 Master of Science (M.Sc.)
 Master of Education (M.Ed.)

References

External links 
 

Education in Nepal
Butwal